Dicktown is a ghost town in Putnam County, in the U.S. state of New York.

Dicktown was named for the fact that a large share of the early settlers were named Richard.

References

Ghost towns in New York (state)
Landforms of Putnam County, New York